Bamuwal  is a village in Kapurthala district of Punjab State, India. The village is administrated by a Sarpanch, who is an elected representative.

Demography 
According to the report published by Census India in 2011, Bamuwal has a total number of 397 houses and population of 2,054 of which include 1,099 males and 955 females. Literacy rate of Bamuwal is 71.66%, lower than state average of 75.84%. The population of children under the age of 6 years is 233 which is 11.34% of total population of Bamuwal, and child sex ratio is approximately  713 lower than state average of 846.

Population data

Air travel connectivity 
The closest airport to the village is Sri Guru Ram Dass Jee International Airport.

Villages in Kapurthala

External links
  Villages in Kapurthala
 Kapurthala Villages List

References

Villages in Kapurthala district